The Green C.4 was a British four-cylinder, water-cooled aero engine that first ran in 1908, it was designed by Gustavus Green and built by the Green Engine Co and Aster Engineering. The engine was one of two Green designs to win a government prize.

Applications
British Army airship Beta
ASL Valkyrie Type A
Roe II Triplane
Roe III Triplane
Roe IV Triplane
Avro Type D
Avro Baby
Blackburn First Monoplane
Handley Page Type B
Handley Page Type D
Hornstein biplane
Macfie Empress
Martin-Handasyde No.3
Neale VII biplane
Short S.27 (Manufacturer No.s S.26 and S.28)
Sopwith Burgess-Wright
Wells Reo

Engines on display
A preserved Green C.4 engine is on public display at the Royal Air Force Museum London.

Specifications (C.4)

See also

References

Notes

Bibliography

 Gunston, Bill. World Encyclopaedia of Aero Engines. Cambridge, England. Patrick Stephens Limited, 1989. 
 Lumsden, Alec. British Piston Engines and their Aircraft. Marlborough, Wiltshire: Airlife Publishing, 2003. .

External links

Flight, March 12, 1910 - "British Flight Engines: The Green". Covers both the C.4 and D.4 engine types.

1900s aircraft piston engines
Green aircraft engines